Scholar has been the name of several ships:

 , a cargo ship of the Harrison Line built in 1886
 , a cargo ship of the Harrison Line built in 1922
 sunk by the U-boat  while convoying with HX 72 in 1940 at (55°11'N,17°58'W) 
 , a cargo ship of the Harrison Line built in 1944
 this Liberty ship was Samidway prior to 1947, and name changed in 1964 to Konstantinos Yemelos
 , a cargo ship of the Harrison Line built in 1954
 was Cunard's Samaria prior to 1969 and after 1979 became Steel Trader

References

See also
 The Scholar Ship, an academic programme run by Royal Caribbean aboard cruise ships
 MV Oceanic II, the "ScholarShip" aboard which the programme was run
 Ship's scholar, the naturalist-aboard-ship during the Age of Exploration, see naturalist
 Scholar (disambiguation)

Ship names